Frederick Guy Butler (21 January 1918 – 26 April 2001) was a South African poet, academic and writer.

Early life 

He was born and educated in the Eastern Cape town of Cradock. He attended Rhodes University and received his MA in 1938. After marrying Jean Satchwell in 1940 he left South Africa to fight in the Second World War. After the war, he read English literature at Brasenose College, Oxford University, graduating in 1947.

Academic career 

He returned to South Africa, lecturing in English at the University of the Witwatersrand. In 1951, he returned to Rhodes University in Makhanda then known as Grahamstown, to take up a post as senior lecturer, and a year later was made professor and head of English. He remained there until his retirement in 1987, when he was appointed Emeritus Professor and Honorary Research Fellow. He received honorary doctorates from the University of Natal, the University of the Witwatersrand and Rhodes University.

Butler promoted the culture of English-speaking South Africans, which led to the charge of separatism from some critics, although he argued for integration rather than exclusivity. He was influential in achieving the recognition of South African English Literature as an accepted discipline. In his poetry he strove for the synthesis of European and African elements into a single voice.

Butler's childhood is depicted in his autobiography, Karoo Morning (1977). Bursting World (1983) continues with an account of his student years and his experiences during World War II, in North Africa and Italy. Stranger to Europe (1952), his first poetry collection, contains fine war poems. Selected Poems appeared in 1975, updated with additional poems in 1989. Pilgrimage to Dias Cross (1987) is a long meditation on racial conflict, incorporating representative voices from various groups, and ending with a prayer for unity. Butler's plays include Richard Gush of Salem (1982) and Demea (1990). A Local Habitation (1991) continues his autobiography up to 1990.

His sister, Dorothy Eyre Murray (née Butler), was also a poet.

Butler died in Grahamstown in 2001. The main theatre in the 1820 Settlers National Monument in Grahamstown is named in his honour. Guy Butler House, a student residence at Rhodes University is also named after him.

Works

Plays 

 The Dam
 The Dove Returns
 
 
 
 Cape Charade
 Kaatjie Kekkelbek

Poetry 

 Stranger to Europe
 South of the Zambezi
 
 Songs and Ballads
 Oxford Book of South African Verse (1959)

Autobiographical books 

 
 Bursting World

Other works

References 

 
 
 

1918 births
2001 deaths
People from Cradock, Eastern Cape
South African people of British descent
South African male poets
Alumni of Brasenose College, Oxford
Rhodes University alumni
Academic staff of Rhodes University
20th-century South African poets
South African military personnel of World War II
South African expatriates in the United States